E101 may refer to:
 Riboflavin, food additive which has been assigned E number 101
 Flavin mononucleotide, biomolecule produced from riboflavin
 European route E101, autoroad of International E-road network between Kyiv and Moscow
 E101, a form for stating applicable legislation within the European Economic Area and Switzerland